Raymundo Torres Rangel (born December 19, 1984) is a Mexican former professional footballer who played as a midfielder.

Career 
Torres began playing competitive football for Club León of his home state of Guanajuato in the Mexican third division at age 14. After playing at Club León in the second division for many years, Torres moved to Atlante, where he debuted in Primera División on 5 October 2008 in a 2–0 win over Pumas UNAM.

Torres played professionally for 16 seasons in various levels of Mexican football. He appeared in 256 competitive matches for León, Atlante, Dorados de Sinaloa, Alacranes de Durango, Correcaminos UAT, C.F. Mérida and Alebrijes de Oaxaca.

After he retired from playing, Torres began working in the youth academy of Chapulineros de Oaxaca.

References

External links

1984 births
Living people
Liga MX players
Ascenso MX players
Club León footballers
Atlante F.C. footballers
Dorados de Sinaloa footballers
Correcaminos UAT footballers
C.F. Mérida footballers
Alacranes de Durango footballers
Alebrijes de Oaxaca players
Association football midfielders
Footballers from Guanajuato
People from Guanajuato City
Mexican footballers